Carlos "The Assassin" James (born February 5, 1972) is a former American football player who played ten seasons in the Arena Football League (AFL) with the Iowa Barnstormers, Buffalo Destroyers, New York Dragons and Tampa Bay Storm. He played college football at the University of Iowa and attended Rich East High School in Park Forest, Illinois.

Early years
James played high school football at Rich East High School. He was a receiver and defensive back at Rich East High. He intercepted 18 passes in his career and earned Tribune All-State honors.

College career
James played for the Iowa Hawkeyes. He was named Co-Defensive MVP of the 1991 Holiday Bowl after intercepting a pass by Ty Detmer at the goal line in the final seconds to preserve a 13-13 tie with the BYU Cougars. Carlos garnered First Team All-Big Ten recognition his senior season in 1992.

Professional career
James played for the Iowa Barnstormers of the AFL from 1995 to 2000, earning First Team All-Arena, Second Team All-Arena and All-Ironman Team honors twice each. He signed with the AFL's Buffalo Destroyers on January 12, 2001. He was signed by the New York Dragons of the AFL on March 6, 2003. James signed with the Tampa Bay Storm of the AFL on November 18, 2003.

References

External links
Just Sports Stats
College stats

Living people
1972 births
Players of American football from Illinois
American football wide receivers
American football defensive backs
African-American players of American football
Iowa Hawkeyes football players
Iowa Barnstormers players
Buffalo Destroyers players
New York Dragons players
Tampa Bay Storm players
People from Park Forest, Illinois
21st-century African-American sportspeople
20th-century African-American sportspeople